The 2011–12 Philadelphia Flyers season was the team's 45th season in the National Hockey League (NHL). The Flyers lost in the second round of the 2012 Stanley Cup playoffs to their crosstown rivals, the New Jersey Devils, in five games.

In July 2011, veteran Jaromir Jagr joined the Flyers as a free agent, his first time in the NHL since the 2007–08 season. The season was also Chris Pronger's last in the NHL. After appearing in three Stanley Cup Finals and winning one with the Anaheim Ducks, Pronger had not played since November 2011 after battling several injuries and suffering from post-concussion syndrome. In 2013, Claude Giroux would replace Pronger as the Flyers' captain.

Off-season
Following his penchant for making big moves, Flyers general manager Paul Holmgren pulled off perhaps the most stunning move of his tenure, trading captain Mike Richards to the Los Angeles Kings in exchange for Brayden Schenn, Wayne Simmonds and a 2012 second-round draft pick, as well as Jeff Carter to the Columbus Blue Jackets for their 2011 first-round pick (Sean Couturier) and Jakub Voracek, all within the span of one hour on June 23. Later that same day, Holmgren addressed the Flyers' long-standing goaltending issues by signing the Phoenix Coyotes' Ilya Bryzgalov to a nine-year, $51 million contract. On July 1, the Flyers signed Jaromir Jagr to a one-year contract, Maxime Talbot to a five-year contract and Andreas Lilja to a two-year contract.

Regular season
Chris Pronger was named the Flyers' captain; however, 13 games into the season, he was lost for the remainder of the regular season and playoffs with severe post-concussion syndrome.

Bryzgalov's play ranged from spectacular to subpar, including being benched in favor of Sergei Bobrovsky for the Flyers' 3–2 loss to the New York Rangers in the 2012 Winter Classic. Twelve rookies played for the Flyers during the season, with the play of Sean Couturier, Brayden Schenn and Matt Read standing out impressively.

The Flyers concluded the regular season with the most powerplay opportunities of all teams (335), the most powerplay goals scored (66) and the most powerplay opportunities against (319).

Season standings

Playoffs
The Flyers drew the Pittsburgh Penguins in the first round of the playoffs, a series in which the two teams combined for an NHL-record 45 goals in the first four games and a total of 309 penalty minutes in an intense, fight-filled series. The Flyers pulled off the upset in six games against a Pittsburgh team that was heavily favored to win the Stanley Cup. But in the second round against the New Jersey Devils, the Flyers' run-and-gun style of play was stymied by the Devils' forechecking and defense, and the Flyers were eliminated in five games.

Schedule and results

Preseason

|- style="background:#cfc;"
| 1 || September 20 || @ Toronto Maple Leafs || 4–0 || 18,480 || 1–0–0 || 
|- style="background:#fcf;"
| 2 || September 21 || Toronto Maple Leafs || 2–4 || 19,452 || 1–1–0 || 
|- style="background:#ffc;"
| 3 || September 22 || Detroit Red Wings || 3–4 (SO) || n/a || 1–1–1 || 
|- style="background:#cfc;"
| 4 || September 23 || @ Detroit Red Wings || 3–1 || 14,310 || 2–1–1 || 
|- style="background:#cfc;"
| 5 || September 26 || New York Rangers || 5–3 || 19,657 || 3–1–1 || 
|- style="background:#cfc;"
| 6 || September 29 || New Jersey Devils || 2–1 || 19,722 || 4–1–1 || 
|-  style="background:#fcf;"
| 7 || October 1 || @ New Jersey Devils || 1–2 || 12,729 || 4–2–1 || 
|-
| colspan="7" style="text-align:center;"|
Notes:
 Game played at John Labatt Centre in London, Ontario.
|-

|-
| Legend:

Regular season

|-  style="background:#cfc;"
| 1 || October 6 || @ Boston Bruins || 2–1 || 17,565 || 1–0–0  || 2 || 
|-  style="background:#cfc;"
| 2 || October 8 || @ New Jersey Devils || 3–0 || 17,625 || 2–0–0 || 4 || 
|-  style="background:#cfc;"
| 3 || October 12 || Vancouver Canucks || 5–4 || 19,632 || 3–0–0 || 6 || 
|-  style="background:#ffc;"
| 4 || October 15 || Los Angeles Kings || 2–3 (OT) || 19,644 || 3–0–1 || 7 || 
|-  style="background:#cfc;"
| 5 || October 18 ||@  Ottawa Senators || 7–2 || 18,059 || 4–0–1 || 9 || 
|-  style="background:#fcf;"
| 6 || October 20 || Washington Capitals || 2–5 || 19,658 || 4–1–1 || 9 || 
|-  style="background:#fcf;"
| 7 || October 22 || St. Louis Blues || 2–4 || 19,593 || 4–2–1 || 9 || 
|-  style="background:#cfc;"
| 8 || October 24 || Toronto Maple Leafs || 4–2 || 19,569 || 5–2–1 || 11 || 
|-  style="background:#fcf;"
| 9 || October 26 || @ Montreal Canadiens || 1–5 || 21,273 || 5–3–1 || 11 || 
|-  style="background:#fcf;"
| 10 || October 27 || Winnipeg Jets || 8–9 || 19,588 || 5–4–1  || 11 || 
|-  style="background:#cfc;"
| 11 || October 29 || Carolina Hurricanes || 5–1 || 19,683 || 6–4–1 || 13 || 
|-

|-  style="background:#cfc;"
| 12 || November 2 || @ Buffalo Sabres || 3–2 || 18,299 || 7–4–1 || 15 || 
|-  style="background:#ffc;"
| 13 || November 3 || New Jersey Devils || 3–4 (SO) || 19,667 || 7–4–2 || 16 || 
|-  style="background:#cfc;"
| 14 || November 5 || Columbus Blue Jackets || 9–2 || 19,784 || 8–4–2 || 18 || 
|-  style="background:#ffc;"
| 15 || November 9 || @ Tampa Bay Lightning || 1–2 (OT) || 19,204 || 8–4–3 || 19 || 
|-  style="background:#cfc;"
| 16 || November 13 || @ Florida Panthers || 3–2 || 15,215 || 9–4–3 || 21 || 
|-  style="background:#cfc;"
| 17 || November 14 || @ Carolina Hurricanes || 5–3 || 14,491 || 10–4–3 || 23 || 
|-  style="background:#cfc;"
| 18 || November 17 || Phoenix Coyotes || 2–1 || 19,610 || 11–4–3 || 25 || 
|-  style="background:#fcf;"
| 19 || November 19 || @ Winnipeg Jets || 4–6 || 15,004 || 11–5–3 || 25 || 
|-  style="background:#fcf;"
| 20 || November 21 || Carolina Hurricanes || 2–4 || 19,632 || 11–6–3 || 25 || 
|-  style="background:#cfc;"
| 21 || November 23 || @ New York Islanders || 4–3 (OT) || 11,086 || 12–6–3 || 27 || 
|-  style="background:#cfc;"
| 22 || November 25 || Montreal Canadiens || 3–1 || 19,991 || 13–6–3 || 29 || 
|-  style="background:#fcf;"
| 23 || November 26 || @ New York Rangers || 0–2 || 18,200 || 13–7–3 || 29 || 
|-

|-  style="background:#cfc;"
| 24 || December 2 || @ Anaheim Ducks || 4–3 (OT) || 15,975 || 14–7–3 || 31 || 
|-  style="background:#cfc;"
| 25 || December 3 || @ Phoenix Coyotes || 4–2 || 14,913 || 15–7–3 || 33 || 
|-  style="background:#cfc;"
| 26 || December 7 || @ Buffalo Sabres || 5–4 (OT) || 18,690 || 16–7–3 || 35 || 
|-  style="background:#cfc;"
| 27 || December 8 || Pittsburgh Penguins || 3–2 || 19,936 || 17–7–3 || 37 || 
|-  style="background:#cfc;"
| 28 || December 10 || Tampa Bay Lightning || 5–2 || 19,772 || 18–7–3  || 39 || 
|-  style="background:#cfc;"
| 29 || December 13 || @ Washington Capitals || 5–1 || 18,506 || 19–7–3 || 41 || 
|-  style="background:#cfc;"
| 30 || December 15 || @ Montreal Canadiens || 4–3 || 21,273 || 20–7–3 || 43 || 
|-  style="background:#fcf;"
| 31 || December 17 || Boston Bruins || 0–6 || 19,948 || 20–8–3 || 43 || 
|-  style="background:#ffc;"
| 32 || December 19 || @ Colorado Avalanche || 2–3 (SO) || 14,889 || 20–8–4 || 44 || 
|-  style="background:#cfc;"
| 33 || December 21 || @ Dallas Stars || 4–1 || 15,061 || 21–8–4 || 46 || 
|-  style="background:#fcf;"
| 34 || December 23 || @ New York Rangers || 2–4 || 18,200 || 21–9–4 || 46 || 
|-  style="background:#fcf;"
| 35 || December 27 || @ Tampa Bay Lightning || 1–5 || 19,204 || 21–10–4 || 46 || 
|-  style="background:#cfc;"
| 36 || December 29 || @ Pittsburgh Penguins || 4–2 || 18,602 || 22–10–4 || 48 || 
|-

|-  style="background:#fcf;"
| 37 || January 2 || New York Rangers || 2–3 || 46,967 || 22–11–4 || 48 || 
|-  style="background:#cfc;"
| 38 || January 5 || Chicago Blackhawks || 5–4 || 19,877 || 23–11–4 || 50 || 
|- style="background:#cfc;"
| 39 || January 7 || Ottawa Senators || 3–2 (OT) || 19,792 || 24–11–4 || 52 || 
|-  style="background:#fcf;"
| 40 || January 8 || @ Ottawa Senators || 4–6 || 20,028 || 24–12–4 || 52 || 
|-  style="background:#cfc;"
| 41 || January 10 || @ Carolina Hurricanes || 2–1 || 14,511 || 25–12–4 || 54 || 
|-  style="background:#cfc;"
| 42 || January 12 || @ New York Islanders || 3–2 || 11,751 || 26–12–4 || 56 || 
|-  style="background:#fcf;"
| 43 || January 14 || @ Nashville Predators || 2–4 || 17,113 || 26–13–4 || 56 || 
|-  style="background:#cfc;"
| 44 || January 17 || Minnesota Wild || 5–1 || 19,787 || 27–13–4 || 58 || 
|-  style="background:#fcf;"
| 45 || January 19 || New York Islanders || 1–4 || 19,796 || 27–14–4 || 58 || 
|-  style="background:#cfc;"
| 46 || January 21 || @ New Jersey Devils || 4–1 || 16,251 || 28–14–4 || 60 || 
|-  style="background:#ffc;"
| 47 || January 22 || Boston Bruins || 5–6 (SO) || 19,851 || 28–14–5 || 61 || 
|-  style="background:#cfc;"
| 48 || January 24 || @ Florida Panthers || 3–2 (SO) || 17,737 || 29–14–5 || 63 || 
|-  style="background:#ffc;"
| 49 || January 31 || Winnipeg Jets || 1–2 (SO) || 19,874 || 29–14–6 || 64 || 
|-
| colspan="11" style="text-align:center;"|
Notes:
 2012 NHL Winter Classic played at Citizens Bank Park in Philadelphia, Pennsylvania.
|-

|-  style="background:#cfc;"
| 50 || February 2 || Nashville Predators || 4–1 || 19,823 || 30–14–6 || 66 || 
|-  style="background:#fcf;"
| 51 || February 4 || New Jersey Devils || 4–6 || 19,862 || 30–15–6 || 66 || 
|-  style="background:#fcf;"
| 52 || February 5 || @ New York Rangers || 2–5 || 18,200 || 30–16–6 || 66 || 
|-  style="background:#ffc;"
| 53 || February 7 || New York Islanders || 0–1 (SO) || 19,614 || 30–16–7 || 67 || 
|-  style="background:#cfc;"
| 54 || February 9 || Toronto Maple Leafs || 4–3 || 19,684 || 31–16–7 || 69 || 
|-  style="background:#fcf;"
| 55 || February 11 || New York Rangers || 2–5 || 19,915 || 31–17–7 || 69 || 
|-  style="background:#fcf;"
| 56 || February 12 || @ Detroit Red Wings || 3–4 || 20,066 || 31–18–7 || 69 || 
|-  style="background:#cfc;"
| 57 || February 16 || Buffalo Sabres || 7–2 || 19,725 || 32–18–7 || 71 || 
|-  style="background:#fcf;"
| 58 || February 18 || Pittsburgh Penguins || 4–6 || 19,958 || 32–19–7 || 71 || 
|-  style="background:#cfc;"
| 59 || February 21 || @ Winnipeg Jets || 5–4 (OT) || 15,004 || 33–19–7 || 73 || 
|-  style="background:#fcf;"
| 60 || February 23 || @ Edmonton Oilers || 0–2 || 16,839 || 33–20–7 || 73 || 
|-  style="background:#cfc;"
| 61 || February 25 || @ Calgary Flames || 5–4 (SO) || 19,289 || 34–20–7 || 75 || 
|-  style="background:#fcf;"
| 62 || February 28 || @ San Jose Sharks || 0–1 || 17,562 || 34–21–7 || 75 || 
|-

|-  style="background:#cfc;"
| 63 || March 1 || New York Islanders || 6–3 || 19,674 || 35–21–7 || 77 || 
|-  style="background:#cfc;"
| 64 || March 4 || @ Washington Capitals || 1–0 || 18,506 || 36–21–7 || 79 || 
|-  style="background:#cfc;"
| 65 || March 6 || Detroit Red Wings || 3–2 || 19,892 || 37–21–7 || 81 || 
|-  style="background:#cfc;"
| 66 || March 8 || Florida Panthers || 5–0 || 19,675 || 38–21–7 || 83 || 
|-  style="background:#cfc;"
| 67 || March 10 || @ Toronto Maple Leafs || 1–0 (SO) || 19,559 || 39–21–7 || 85 || 
|-  style="background:#fcf;"
| 68 || March 11 || @ New Jersey Devils || 1–4 || 15,107 || 39–22–7 || 85 || 
|-  style="background:#cfc;"
| 69 || March 13 || New Jersey Devils || 3–0 || 19,724 || 40–22–7 || 87 || 
|-  style="background:#cfc;"
| 70 || March 15 || @ New York Islanders || 3–2 || 13,827 || 41–22–7 || 89 || 
|-  style="background:#ffc;"
| 71 || March 17 || @ Boston Bruins || 2–3 (SO) || 17,565 || 41–22–8 || 90 || 
|-  style="background:#cfc;"
| 72 || March 18 || Pittsburgh Penguins || 3–2 (OT) || 19,927 || 42–22–8 || 92 || 
|-  style="background:#fcf;"
| 73 || March 20 || Florida Panthers || 1–2 || 19,568 || 42–23–8 || 92 || 
|-  style="background:#cfc;"
| 74 || March 22 || Washington Capitals || 2–1 (SO) || 19,948 || 43–23–8  || 94 || 
|-  style="background:#cfc;"
| 75 || March 24 || Montreal Canadiens || 4–1 || 19,931 || 44–23–8 || 96 || 
|-  style="background:#fcf;"
| 76 || March 26 || Tampa Bay Lightning || 3–5 || 19,590 || 44–24–8 || 96 || 
|-  style="background:#cfc;"
| 77 || March 29 || @ Toronto Maple Leafs || 7–1 || 19,415 || 45–24–8 || 98 || 
|-  style="background:#ffc;"
| 78 || March 31 || Ottawa Senators || 3–4 (SO) || 19,822 || 45–24–9 || 99 || 
|-

|-  style="background:#cfc;"
| 79 || April 1 || @ Pittsburgh Penguins || 6–4 || 18,601 || 46–24–9 || 101 || 
|-  style="background:#fcf;"
| 80 || April 3 || New York Rangers || 3–5 || 19,898 || 46–25–9 || 101 || 
|-  style="background:#cfc;"
| 81 || April 5 || Buffalo Sabres || 2–1 || 19,873 || 47–25–9 || 103 || 
|-  style="background:#fcf;"
| 82 || April 7 || @ Pittsburgh Penguins || 2–4 || 18,616 || 47–26–9 || 103 || 
|-

|-
| Legend:

Playoffs

|- style="background:#cfc;"
| 1 || April 11 || Philadelphia || 4–3 || Pittsburgh || OT || Bryzgalov || 18,565 || Flyers lead 1–0 || 
|- style="background:#cfc;"
| 2 || April 13 || Philadelphia || 8–5 || Pittsburgh || || Bryzgalov || 18,626 || Flyers lead 2–0 || 
|- style="background:#cfc;"
| 3 || April 15 || Pittsburgh || 4–8 || Philadelphia || || Bryzgalov || 20,092 || Flyers lead 3–0 || 
|- style="background:#fcf;"
| 4 || April 18 || Pittsburgh || 10–3 || Philadelphia || || Bryzgalov || 20,172 || Flyers lead 3–1 || 
|- style="background:#fcf;"
| 5 || April 20 || Philadelphia || 2–3 || Pittsburgh || || Bryzgalov || 18,628 || Flyers lead 3–2 || 
|- style="background:#cfc;"
| 6 || April 22 || Pittsburgh || 1–5 || Philadelphia || || Bryzgalov || 20,127 || Flyers win 4–2 || 
|-

|- style="background:#cfc;"
| 1 || April 29 || New Jersey || 3–4 || Philadelphia || OT  || Bryzgalov || 19,972 || Flyers lead 1–0 || 
|- style="background:#fcf;"
| 2 || May 1 || New Jersey || 4–1 || Philadelphia ||  || Bryzgalov || 20,131 ||  Series tied 1–1 || 
|- style="background:#fcf;"
| 3 || May 3 || Philadelphia || 3–4 || New Jersey || OT || Bryzgalov || 17,625 || Devils lead 2–1 || 
|- style="background:#fcf;"
| 4 || May 6 || Philadelphia || 2–4 || New Jersey ||  || Bryzgalov || 17,625 || Devils lead 3–1 || 
|- style="background:#fcf;"
| 5 || May 8 || New Jersey || 3–1 || Philadelphia ||  || Bryzgalov || 19,818  || Devils win 4–1 || 
|-

|-
| Legend:

Player statistics

Scoring
 Position abbreviations: C = Center; D = Defense; G = Goaltender; LW = Left Wing; RW = Right Wing
  = Joined team via a transaction (e.g., trade, waivers, signing) during the season. Stats reflect time with the Flyers only.
  = Left team via a transaction (e.g., trade, waivers, release) during the season. Stats reflect time with the Flyers only.

Goaltending

Awards and records

Awards

Records

Among the team records set during the 2011–12 season was Scott Hartnell tying the team record for most goals in a single period (3) on January 22. From March 6 to March 15, goaltender Ilya Bryzgalov set the team record for longest shutout sequence (249 minutes and 43 seconds) and his three consecutive shutouts from March 8 to March 13 tied the team record. On March 18, Hartnell scored the latest regular season overtime goal in team history at 4:59 of the period. The Flyers won 25 times on the road for the second consecutive season, tying the team record.

A number of franchise playoff records were set during the Flyers conference quarterfinals series against the Pittsburgh Penguins. In game two, Claude Giroux set a single playoff game team record for most points (6) and Sean Couturier tied one for most points by a rookie (4). The Flyers two shorthanded goals during the game also tied a team record. In game three, the Flyers scored four powerplay goals, tying a team record. During game four, the Flyers tied two team records for most powerplay goals scored during a single playoff period (3) and most goals allowed during a playoff game (10). The twelve powerplay goals the Flyers scored during the series is a franchise single series high.

Milestones

Suspensions and fines

Transactions
The Flyers were involved in the following transactions from June 16, 2011, the day after the deciding game of the 2011 Stanley Cup Finals, through June 11, 2012, the day of the deciding game of the 2012 Stanley Cup Finals.

Trades

Players acquired

Players lost

Signings

Draft picks

Philadelphia's picks at the 2011 NHL Entry Draft, which was held at the Xcel Energy Center in Saint Paul, Minnesota, on June 24–25, 2011. The Flyers traded their first-round pick, 25th overall, and their third-round pick, 85th overall, to the Toronto Maple Leafs for Kris Versteeg on February 14, 2011. They also traded their original second and fifth-round picks in two different trades.

Farm teams
American Hockey League – Adirondack Phantoms (Standings)
 ECHL – Trenton Titans

Notes

References
General
 
 
 
Specific

External links

 Philadelphia Flyers Historical Salaries from CapGeek.com

Philadelphia Flyers seasons
Philadelphia Flyers season, 2011-12
Phil
Philadelphia Flyers
Philadelphia Flyers